Lathyrus laevigatus is a flowering plant of the genus Lathyrus in the legume family Fabaceae. It is native to middle, eastern, and southeastern Europe.

References 

 Allkin, R. et al. 1986. Vicieae Database Project 7:19.
 Bässler, M. 1973. Revision der eurasiatischen Arten von Lathyrus L. Sect. Orobus (L.) Gren. & Godr. Feddes Repert. 84:370.
 Encke, F. et al. 1984. Zander: Handwörterbuch der Pflanzennamen, 13. Auflage.
 Hess, H. E. et al. 1976. Flora der Schweiz, ed. 2.
 Komarov, V. L. et al., eds. 1934–1964. Flora SSSR.
 Tutin, T. G. et al., eds. 1964–1980. Flora europaea.
 Yakovlev, G. P. et al. 1996. Legumes of Northern Eurasia.

laevigatus
Flora of Europe